Francisco Ferreira may refer to:

 Francisco Ferreira (Paraguayan footballer) (born 1970), former Paraguayan football striker
 Francisco Ferreira (Portuguese footballer) (1919–1986), Portuguese football midfield
 Francisco Reis Ferreira (born 1997), Portuguese footballer
 Patxi Ferreira (Francisco Ferreira Colmenero, born 1967), retired Spanish footballer